Hits and Exit Wounds is a retrospective album by Alabama 3, featuring several different versions of well-known tracks taken from all of their albums, and two previously unreleased tracks.

Track listing 

"Hypo Full of Love (The 12 Step Plan)" (taken from Exile on Coldharbour Lane) - 5:34
"Woke Up This Morning" (Sopranos mix) featuring Street Angels Choir NYC and The Man with the Itch, Mr. Shifta (taken from La Peste) - 4:03
"Hello... I'm Johnny Cash" (taken from Outlaw) - 3:47
"Mao Tse Tung Said" (taken from Exile on Coldharbour Lane) - 4:54
"Mansion on the Hill" (Arthur Baker remix) (taken from "Mansion on the Hill" single) - 5:45
"U Don't Danse to Tekno Anymore" (taken from The Last Train to Mashville vol. 2) - 3:41
"How Can I Protect You" Featuring Aslan (taken from Outlaw) - 5:13
"Woody Guthrie" (taken from Power in the Blood) - 4:15
"Ain't Goin' to Goa" (taken from Exile on Coldharbour Lane) - 3:48
"Monday Don't Mean Anything" (taken from M.O.R.) - 4:00
"Sad Eyed Lady of the Low Life" (taken from La Peste) - 4:16
"Amos Moses" (taken from M.O.R.) - 4:50
"Too Sick to Pray" (taken from La Peste) - 4:26
"Up Above My Head" (taken from Outlaw) - 3:57
"R.E.H.A.B." (taken from Power in the Blood) - 3:45
"Speed of the Sound of Loneliness" (taken from Exile on Coldharbour Lane) - 4:31
"Ska'd for Life" (Orbital mix) - 4:10
"Peace in the Valley" (taken from The Last Train to Mashville vol. 2) - 3:53

2008 compilation albums
Alabama 3 albums
One Little Independent Records compilation albums